The Southern Ocean overturning circulation is a two-cell system in the Southern Ocean that connects different water basins within the global circulation. It is driven by upwelling and downwelling, which are a result of the physical ocean processes that are influenced by freshwater fluxes and wind stress. The global ocean circulation is an essential mechanism in our global climate system due to its influence on the global heat, fresh water and carbon budgets.  The upwelling in the upper cell is associated with mid-deep water that is brought to the surface, whereas the upwelling in the lower cell is linked to the fresh and abyssal waters around Antarctica. Around 27 ± 7 Sverdrup (Sv) of deep water wells up to the surface in the Southern Ocean. This upwelled water is partly transformed to lighter water and denser water, respectively 22 ± 4 Sv and 5 ± 5 Sv. The densities of these waters change due to heat and buoyancy fluxes which result in upwelling in the upper cell and downwelling in the lower cell.

Dynamics

Upper cell 

The upper cell is driven by wind generated flow, a result of the Westerlies, that brings water from the Circumpolar Deep Water (CDW) to the surface.  Zonal wind stress induces upwelling near the pole and downwelling at the equator due to the zonal surface-wind maximum. This wind-driven circulation is also called the Deacon cell and acts to overturn water supporting the thermal wind current of the ACC and creating a storage of potential energy. This upper cell process is also known as Ekman transport. 
The meridional overturning flow is from the north to the south in deep waters and from the south to the north at the ocean surface. At the surface deep waters are exposed to the atmosphere and surface buoyancy forces. There is a net gain of buoyancy in the upper cell as a result of the freshening of the water caused by precipitation and the melting of sea ice during summer (on the Southern Hemipshere). This buoyancy gain transforms the waters into lighter, less dense waters, such as Subantarctic Mode Water (SAMW) and Antarctic Intermediate Water (AAIW). Around 22 ± 4 Sv of the total upwelled water in the overturning circulation is transformed into lighter waters in the upper cell. The overturning process of density surfaces is balanced through the baroclinic instability of the thermal wind currents. This instability flattens the density surfaces and the transport towards the poles resulting in energetic, time-dependent eddying motions. The potential energy from the wind-driven circulation is then flattened out by eddies.

Missing-mixing paradox 
The missing-mixing paradox assumes that dense water is upwelled through the thermocline to close the circulation. To achieve this, vertical mixing is needed in the thermocline, which is not observed.  Instead, dense water from sinking regions returned to the surface in nearly adiabatic pathways along density isopycnals, which was already written by Harald Sverdrup (oceanographer).

Lower cell 

The lower cell is driven by freshwater fluxes where sea-ice formation and melting play an important role. The formation of sea-ice is accompanied by brine rejection, resulting in water with a higher salinity and density and therefore buoyancy loss. When ice melts there is a freshwater flow and exposure to the atmosphere. If water turns into ice, there is more salt in the water and less exposure to the atmosphere. Due to seasonal variations, there is a gain of buoyancy during summer and a loss of buoyancy in winter. This cold and dense water filled with salt is called Dense Shelf Water (DSW). DSW is then transformed into Antarctic Bottom Water (AABW), originating from the Ross Sea,Weddell Sea and along the eastern coast of Antartica. Around 5 ± 5 Sv of AABW is formed in the lower cell of the Southern Ocean circulation, which is around a third of the total AABW formation.  Current knowledge about the overturning circulation, in particular the lower cell, is based on large-scale inverse models. These models generally misrepresent the importance of fresh water fluxes and sea-ice interaction.

Link to the global circulation 

The circulation of the world's oceans is linked to the atmosphere in multiple ways. They are both, in essence, driven by the available solar energy and they are coupled by the friction at the sea surface. Because of the imbalance between the available solar energy at the poles and at the equator there is a meridional temperature gradient that gives rise to the wind patterns on Earth. The movement of the atmosphere is responsible for the movement of the ocean at the surface. The deep ocean largely responds to small perturbations in water density over large areas, caused by processes that influence the temperature or salinity of the water. The circulation of these systems result in a redistribution of the global energy budget that governs the local climate.  The atmosphere and the ocean are also chemically linked, where the ocean is in equilibrium with the atmospheric  concentration. The ocean is a net carbon sink, due to the increase in atmospheric  during the past century. Currently, the oceans are responsible for the uptake about 25% of our current carbon emissions.

AMOC 

The Southern Ocean plays a key role in the closure of the Atlantic meridional overturning circulation by compensating for the North Atlantic downwelling by upwelling of North Atlantic Deep Water and connects the interior ocean to the surface. This upwelling is induced by the strong westerly winds that blow over the ACC.  Observations suggest that approximately 80 percent of global deep water is upwelled in the Southern Ocean.

Carbon budget 
Ocean upwelling coincides with increased biological activity due to the increased concentration of nutrients. The nutrients are used by phytoplankton which use them in combination with carbon through photosynthesis, creating  a local carbon sink. Southern Ocean upwelling also functions as a carbon sink in regions where water formation takes place. Deep water with low dissolved carbon concentrations rises to the surface where it is exposed to higher atmospheric carbon concentrations than it has been exposed to previously. Deep water has such low dissolved carbon concentrations because it has not been at the surface for centuries when atmospheric carbon concentrations were lower than they are now. The water will reach a new carbon balance and is later brought down again through downwelling resulting in a net carbon sink. On the other hand, regions where deep warm circumpolar carbon rich waters are brought to the surface through upwelling, outgas  through exposure to the atmosphere, partly compensating the carbon sink effect of the overturning circulation.

Climate change 
Understanding the mechanisms that govern the upwelling and the rates it takes, is fundamental for our understanding of the climate system as it controls the rate at which the ocean reservoirs communicate with the surface. It also affects the climate in several other important ways. It transports heat through the circulation of its waters thus modulating ocean heat content. It also modulates sea level through its effect on ice shelf melt. Finally, it affects Southern Hemisphere sea ice cover, which is linked to the albedo of the Earth’s surface. These effects together mean that the Southern Ocean Circulation has a significant effect on climate sensitivity.

Consequently, the effect of climate change on the Southern Ocean is an important research topic when trying to understand the global carbon budget. The most important mode that drives the climate in the extratropical Southern Hemisphere is the Southern Annular Mode (SAM) which has consistently been positive in the past few decades, likely as a result of a combination of ozone depletion and global warming. The consistent positive mode of the SAM has so far resulted in a poleward shift of the westerlies and an increase in their strength resulting in an increase in the ventilation of carbon rich deep waters, which is causing a weakening of the carbon sink in the Southern Ocean. Furthermore, increased temperatures seem to result in a freshening of the Antarctic intermediate waters as a result of increased precipitation patterns. However, because the climate dynamics in the Southern Ocean involve feedback mechanisms between the ocean, atmosphere and cryosphere that are poorly understood and not represented well in the current generation of climate models, the effects of climate change on Southern Ocean overturning circulation is still quite uncertain. CMIP5 models predict with “low confidence” a 20% increase in the overall transport of upper-ocean overturning cell in the 21st century. No new studies have improved on this assessment in the Sixth Assessment Report. For the lower cell overturning circulation, combined evidence from observational, numerical and paleoclimate evidence gives “medium confidence” that the lower cell circulation will continue decreasing in the 21st century as a result of increased melt from the Antarctic Ice Sheet.

References 

Currents of the Southern Ocean